Robert Bennie Cranston (January 14, 1791 – January 27, 1873) was a U.S. Representative from Rhode Island, brother of Henry Young Cranston.

Biography
Born in Newport, Rhode Island, Cranston attended the public schools.
He was employed in the collection of internal revenue 1812–1815.
Sheriff of Newport County 1818–1827.
Postmaster of Newport in 1827.

Cranston was elected as a Whig to the Twenty-fifth, Twenty-sixth, and Twenty-seventh Congresses (March 4, 1837 – March 3, 1843).
He served as member of the State house of representatives 1843–1847, and served one year as speaker.
He served in the State senate.

Cranston was elected as a Whig to the Thirtieth Congress (March 4, 1847 – March 3, 1849).
He was elected the first mayor of Newport on June 9, 1853.
He resigned the same day.
He served as presidential elector on the Republican ticket in 1864.
He died in Newport, Rhode Island, January 27, 1873.
He was interred in the Island Cemetery in Newport.

Sources

1791 births
1873 deaths
Politicians from Newport, Rhode Island
Members of the United States House of Representatives from Rhode Island
Rhode Island Whigs
Burials in Rhode Island
Speakers of the Rhode Island House of Representatives
Republican Party members of the Rhode Island House of Representatives
Whig Party members of the United States House of Representatives
19th-century American politicians